Three ships of the United States Navy have been named Allegheny, after the Allegheny River.

Sources

United States Navy ship names